Niemegk is an abandoned village in the former district of Bitterfeld in Saxony-Anhalt.

Notable people
Werner Rauh (1913-2000), German botanist.

Former villages in Germany